Polka dot is a pattern consisting of an array of large filled circles of the same size.

Polka dots are commonly seen on children's clothing, toys, furniture, ceramics, and Central European folk art, but they appear in a wide array of contexts. The pattern rarely appears in formal contexts, and is generally confined to more playful attire such as bathing suits and lingerie.

Etymology 

It is likely that the term originated because of the popularity of the polka dance around the same time the pattern became fashionable, just as many other products and fashions of the era also adopted the "polka" name.

Usage 

In 1962, DC Comics introduced Polka-Dot Man with irregularly-sized and differently coloured dots. Polka-Dot Man made his first theatrical debut in the film The Suicide Squad directed by James Gunn. He was played by actor David Dastmalchian.

Since 1975, a red-on-white Polka-dotted jersey is awarded to the leader in the Mountain stages of the annual Tour de France cycling tournament.

Some people associate polka dots with Venezuelan fashion designer Carolina Herrera, who used polka dots on most of her dresses during the late 1980s and early 1990s, as well as on the boxes of perfume Carolina Herrera, Herrera For Men, Aquaflore and Flore.

Much of the Japanese artist Yayoi Kusama's work features a polka dot motif, and the cryptocurrency Polkadot takes its name after the design.

The polka dot also appears in popular music. "Itsy Bitsy Teenie Weenie Yellow Polka Dot Bikini" is a novelty song telling the story of a shy girl in a very revealing bathing suit who stays immersed in the ocean water to hide from view. It was written by Paul Vance and Lee Pockriss and first released in June 1960 by Brian Hyland.  Before that however, "Polka Dots and Moonbeams" was a popular song with music by Jimmy Van Heusen and lyrics by Johnny Burke, published in 1940. It was Frank Sinatra's first hit recorded with the Tommy Dorsey Orchestra. The song is one of the top 100 most-frequently recorded jazz standards with arrangements by Gil Evans and others and notable recordings by Lester Young, Sarah Vaughn and many others.

The 1943 Twentieth Century Fox Technicolor musical film The Gang's All Here, directed by Busby Berkeley, featured a large production number "The Polka-Dot Polka".  The song was written by Harry Warren and Leo Robin, referencing the 19th Century Polka Dot craze in the lyric, and sung by Alice Faye with the Busby Berkeley dancers.

See also 

 Ben-Day dots
 Hypoestes phyllostachya
 Pardopsis punctatissima
 Polka Dot Door
 Polka-dot paint
 Stripe pattern

References

Further reading 

 Peacock, John (2007). Fashion Since 1900: The Complete Sourcebook. Thames & Hudson. 
 Stewart, Jude (2010). "Seeing Spots: From lepers to paranoia, the twisted history of the polka dot" Slate
 Welters, Linda and Cunningham, Patricia A. (eds.) (2005). Twentieth-century American Fashion. Berg. 

Patterns
Dot patterns
Polka